S3 Graphics Chrome 400 is a computer graphics chip made by VIA. It was the successor of S3 Chrome S20 series.

History
VIA planned the production of two new graphics chips, Chrome 440 and 430, by the end of 2007. The Chrome 460 supported DirectX 10 and adopted a 90 nanometer process, while the Chrome 430 was to support DirectX 10.1 using a 65 nanometer process. The Chrome 400 series was codenamed 'Destination'. Both chips were to be manufactured by Fujitsu. Volume production was expected to start before the end of the year.

The 430 GT was released on 2008-03-20 in the US market, while 440 GTX was released on 2008-05-30.

Features
The production models were made in 65 nm process, support DirectX 10.1, and use PCI Express 2.0 interface. Chrome engine supported variable-length decoding, and dual-stream Blu-ray playback (440 GTX). The display unit included two dual-link DVI transmitters with integrated HDMI (audio pass-through) and HDCP, an integrated dual-channel LVDS transmitter, an integrated TV/HDTV encoder, and support for two analog CRTs. 440 GTX ran at 725 MHz core speed.

Chrome 400 ULP
ULP was the mobile line for the Chrome 400. 430 ULP includes features in 430 GT, while 435 ULP and 440 ULP includes features in 440 GTX.

This product was released on 2008-09-24.

Reception
In TechPowerUp's review of the 800/800 MHz core/memory version of S3 Graphics Chrome 440 GTX 256 MB video card, its performance was observed to be in the range of Radeon 3450 and GeForce 8500 GT. At a 1024×768 resolution, it was slightly slower than GeForce 9400 GT. Performance per dollar was the lowest of the list. Power consumption is on par with those products.

References

External links
 S3 Graphics Chrome 400 page

Graphics cards